Trunch is a village and parish in Norfolk, England, situated three miles north of North Walsham and two miles from the coast at Mundesley. At the Census 2011 the village had a population of 909.

The villages name origin is uncertain perhaps, 'upland wood'.

Trunch never had any rail connections in the village itself but it does have a rail map outside of its pub. Before the 1960s one could go to the next village along (Knapton) to catch a train to Cromer or North Walsham from Paston & Knapton railway station (M&GN) to catch a train. Now the nearest stations are Gunton and North Walsham.

St Botolph's Parish Church
Trunch Parish Church is the Grade I listed 14th-century church of St Botolph. The church is famous for its carved and painted wood font canopy featuring lower panels with paintings of the twelve Apostles, a cornice including a Latin inscription, and above six arches filled with tracery. Only four such canopies still exist in England. St Botolph's also features a hammerbeam roof with carved angels, as well as medieval misericords under the seats in the chancel. Another medieval survival is the rood screen depicting 11 disciples and St Paul (their faces were scratched out during the Reformation). Lord Nelson's daughter is said to have been married in the church.

In 1589 Robert Thexton became the rector of Trunch. While at Cambridge University, Thexton had been the room-mate of Christopher Marlowe the famous, and infamous, Elizabethan playwright.

In popular culture
The fictional village of St Just-near-Trunch is known in English folk music as the home of the former satirical folk duo, The Kipper Family.

Gallery

References

External links

Trunch Farmworkers Strike - Account of 1906 agricultural dispute in the village, from EASF.

Villages in Norfolk
Civil parishes in Norfolk
North Norfolk